Thomas Edgar Underhill FRSE FRCSE (1854 – 8 May 1917) was a 19th/20th century English physician and surgeon. He was an expert on Gorham's disease and spontaneous fractures.

Life
He was born in Tipton in Staffordshire, the youngest son of Emily Margaretta Roe and her husband, Dr William Lees Underhill (1814-1894).

He studied medicine at the University of Edinburgh graduating with an MB ChB in 1876. He then joined his father as a general practitioner in Tipton before spending 27 years at Barnt Green near Bromsgrove. He lived at "Dunedin" in Barnt Green, named in homage to his alma mater.

He was elected a Fellow of the Royal Society of Edinburgh in 1889. His proposers were James Matthews Duncan, Sir John Macdonald, Lord Kingsburgh, Peter Guthrie Tait and Sir German Sims Woodhead.

He was President of the Birmingham Medical Mission and President of the Birmingham branch of the British Medical Association and of the Midland Medical Society.

Underhill died on 8 May 1917.

Family

He was married to Mary Isabel Charlton (b.1857) and together they had at least 14 children.

He was brother to Charles Edward Underhill.

Publications

Spontaneous Fractures (1886)

References

1854 births
1917 deaths
People from Tipton
19th-century British medical doctors
20th-century British medical doctors
Fellows of the Royal Society of Edinburgh